Ketab-e Jom'e (Persian: کتاب جمعه; Book of Friday) was a weekly magazine for literary, social and scientific issues. The magazine was published between 1979 and 1980. Only 36 issues of Ketab-e Jom'e were published. Its founder, publisher and editor was Ahmad Shamlou. The magazine was based in Tehran.

References

1979 establishments in Iran
1980 disestablishments in Iran
Defunct literary magazines
Defunct magazines published in Iran
Defunct political magazines
Magazines established in 1979
Magazines disestablished in 1980
Magazines published in Tehran
Persian-language magazines
Weekly magazines published in Iran